The Marriage of Princess Demidoff is a 1922 German silent drama film directed by Frederic Zelnik and starring Lya Mara, Charles Willy Kayser, and Olga Limburg. It premiered at the Marmorhaus cinema in Berlin.

The film's sets were designed by the art director Fritz Lederer.

Cast
In alphabetical order

References

Bibliography

External links

1922 films
Films of the Weimar Republic
Films directed by Frederic Zelnik
German silent feature films
German black-and-white films
1922 drama films
German drama films
Silent drama films
1920s German films